The 1910 Baylor football team was an American football team that represented Baylor University as an independent during the 1910 college football season. In its first season under head coach Ralph Glaze, the team compiled a 6–1–1 record and outscored opponents by a total of 217 to 17.

The sole loss was because Baylor left at halftime, with the score tied 6–6 against Texas, due to a dispute with the referee.

Schedule

References

Baylor
Baylor Bears football seasons
Baylor Bears football